Three ships of the Royal Navy and Royal Fleet Auxiliary have been named Sir Galahad, after the knight of Arthurian legend.

  was a  used as a minesweeper in World War II
  (L3005), a landing ship (logistic), was lost in the Falklands War
  (L3005), a landing ship (logistic) named for (and given the same pennant number as) the previous Sir Galahad, was involved in the 2003 invasion of Iraq

Royal Navy ship names